Blitzstein (German: "lightning stone") is an Ashkenazi surname. Notable people with the surname include: 
Herbert Blitzstein (1934–1997), American loanshark, bookmaker, and racketeer
Marc Blitzstein (1905–1964), American composer, lyricist, and librettist

Yiddish-language surnames